Joseph Andrew Krakoski, Jr. (born December 18, 1937) is a former American football defensive back in the National Football League for the Washington Redskins, as well as the Oakland Raiders of the American Football League.  Krakoski was a fourteen time letter winner at Westville High School in Westville, Illinois.

He played college football at the University of Illinois where he was a member of Sigma Pi fraternity.  He was drafted in the sixth round of the 1961 NFL Draft, as well as in the 18th round of the 1961 AFL Draft.

References

1937 births
Living people
American football defensive backs
Illinois Fighting Illini football players
Oakland Raiders players
People from Danville, Illinois
Washington Redskins players
American people of Slavic descent
American Football League players